The 2017–18 HC Slovan Bratislava season will be the 6th season for Bratislava based club in Kontinental Hockey League.

Schedule and results

Pre-season

|-bgcolor= ffeeaa
|1||July 19|| Dynamo Pardubice|| 2–1 SO ||Slovan Bratislava|| Tipsport Arena||500||
|-bgcolor= ffbbbb
|2||July 20|| Dynamo Pardubice|| 5–2 ||Slovan Bratislava|| Tipsport Arena||500||
|-bgcolor= d0e7ff
|3||July 25||Slovan Bratislava|| 3–2 SO ||Spartak Moscow|| Ondrej Nepela Arena||4,246||
|-bgcolor= ffbbbb
|4||August 2||Slovan Bratislava|| 4–6 || Aukro Berani Zlín|| Ondrej Nepela Arena||3,411||
|-bgcolor= ffbbbb
|5||August 3|| Kometa Brno|| 3–0 ||Slovan Bratislava|| DRFG Arena||||
|-bgcolor= ffbbbb
|6||August 8||Slovan Bratislava|| 2–3 || Dinamo Riga||Kassel, Germany||||
|-bgcolor= ffbbbb
|7||August 9|| Kassel Huskies|| 3–2 ||Slovan Bratislava||Kassel, Germany||3,122||
|-bgcolor= ffbbbb
|8||August 10||Vityaz|| 4–2 ||Slovan Bratislava||Kassel, Germany||||
|-bgcolor= d0e7ff
|9||August 15||Slovan Bratislava|| 3–2 SO || Kometa Brno|| Ondrej Nepela Arena||4,386||
|-bgcolor= ffbbbb
|10||August 17||HC ’05 Banská Bystrica|| 5–2 ||Slovan Bratislava|| Banská Bystrica Ice Stadium||2,380||
|-

|-
|align="center"|

Regular season

|-bgcolor= ffbbbb
|1||23||SKA Saint Petersburg|| 7–1 ||Slovan Bratislava|| Mazanec ||Ice Palace || 10,260 ||0–0–0–1||
|-bgcolor= ffbbbb
|2||25||Lokomotiv Yaroslavl|| 5–1 ||Slovan Bratislava|| Mazanec ||Arena 2000 || 7,100 ||0–0–0–2||
|-bgcolor= ffbbbb
|3||27||Dynamo Moscow|| 4–2 ||Slovan Bratislava|| Štěpánek ||VTB Ice Palace || 4,161 ||0–0–0–3||
|-bgcolor= ddffdd
|4||30||Slovan Bratislava|| 4–2 || Dinamo Minsk|| Mazanec ||Ondrej Nepela Arena || 7,406 ||1–0–0–3||
|-

|-bgcolor= ddffdd
|5||1||Slovan Bratislava|| 2–1 ||Sibir Novosibirsk|| Mazanec ||Ondrej Nepela Arena || 6,411 ||2–0–0–3||
|-bgcolor= ffeeaa
|6||3||Slovan Bratislava|| 2–3 SO||Yugra Khanty-Mansiysk|| Mazanec ||Ondrej Nepela Arena || 7,040 ||2–0–1–3|| 
|-bgcolor= ffbbbb
|7||5||Slovan Bratislava|| 1–4 ||Avangard Omsk|| Mazanec ||Ondrej Nepela Arena || 6,628 ||2–0–1–4|| 
|-bgcolor= ffeeaa
|8||8||Slovan Bratislava|| 3–4 OT ||Neftekhimik Nizhnekamsk|| Mazanec ||Ondrej Nepela Arena || 6,780 ||2–0–2–4|| 
|-bgcolor= ffeeaa
|9||11||Admiral Vladivostok|| 2–1 SO||Slovan Bratislava|| Štěpánek ||Fetisov Arena || 5,014 ||2–0–3–4|| 
|-bgcolor= ffbbbb
|10||13|| Kunlun Red Star|| 2–0 ||Slovan Bratislava|| Mazanec ||Feiyang Ice Skating Center, Shanghai || 2,200  ||2–0–3–5|| 
|-bgcolor= ddffdd
|11||15||Amur Khabarovsk|| 2–3 ||Slovan Bratislava|| Štěpánek || Platinum Arena || 5,834 ||3–0–3–5|| 
|-bgcolor= ffbbbb
|12||20||Slovan Bratislava|| 3–6 ||Ak Bars Kazan|| Štěpánek ||Ondrej Nepela Arena || 6,674 ||3–0–3–6|| 
|-bgcolor= ffbbbb
|13||23||Vityaz Podolsk|| 4–0 ||Slovan Bratislava|| Mazanec ||Vityaz Ice Palace || 4,369 ||3–0–3–7|| 
|-bgcolor= ffbbbb
|14||25||CSKA Moscow|| 3–2 ||Slovan Bratislava|| Mazanec || CSKA Ice Palace || 3,077 ||3–0–3–8|| 
|-bgcolor= ddffdd
|15||27||Slovan Bratislava|| 4–3 ||Vityaz Podolsk|| Štěpánek ||Ondrej Nepela Arena || 5,758 ||4–0–3–8|| 
|-

|-bgcolor= ffeeaa
|16||1||Slovan Bratislava|| 1–2 OT ||Spartak Moscow|| Mazanec ||Ondrej Nepela Arena || 6,993 ||4–0–4–8|| 
|-bgcolor= d0e7ff
|17||3||Slovan Bratislava|| 5–4 SO ||Severstal Cherepovets|| Mazanec ||Ondrej Nepela Arena || 6,142 ||4–1–4–8|| 
|-bgcolor= ffbbbb
|18||5||Slovan Bratislava|| 0–1 ||Torpedo Nizhny Novgorod|| Mazanec ||Ondrej Nepela Arena || 5,712 ||4–1–4–9|| 
|-bgcolor= ffeeaa
|19||7||Slovan Bratislava|| 2–3 OT ||  Dinamo Riga|| Mazanec ||Ondrej Nepela Arena || 7,950 ||4–1–5–9|| 
|-bgcolor= ddffdd
|20||9||Slovan Bratislava|| 4–1 || Sochi|| Mazanec ||Ondrej Nepela Arena || 6,051 ||5–1–5–9|| 
|-bgcolor= ffbbbb
|21||12||Avtomobilist Yekaterinburg || 6–3 || Slovan Bratislava|| Mazanec ||KRK Uralets || 4,000 ||5–1–5–10|| 
|-bgcolor= ffbbbb
|22||14||Traktor Chelyabinsk || 2–1 || Slovan Bratislava|| Štěpánek ||Traktor Ice Arena || 7,200 ||5–1–5–11|| 
|-bgcolor= ffbbbb
|23||16||Metallurg Magnitogorsk || 4–1 || Slovan Bratislava|| Mazanec, Štěpánek ||Arena Metallurg || 6,888 ||5–1–5–12|| 
|-bgcolor= ffbbbb
|24||18||Lada Togliatti || 5–1 || Slovan Bratislava|| Mazanec ||Lada Arena || 5,142 ||5–1–5–13|| 
|-bgcolor= ddffdd
|25||23||Slovan Bratislava|| 4–2 || Dynamo Moscow|| Mazanec ||Ondrej Nepela Arena || 6,832 ||6–1–5–13|| 
|-bgcolor= ffbbbb
|26||25||Slovan Bratislava|| 2–3 || Lokomotiv Yaroslavl|| Mazanec ||Ondrej Nepela Arena || 7,554 ||6–1–5–14|| 
|-bgcolor= ffbbbb
|27||27||Slovan Bratislava|| 0–5 || SKA Saint Petersburg|| Štěpánek, Mazanec ||Ondrej Nepela Arena || 10,055 ||6–1–5–15|| 
|-

|-
|align="center"|

Standings

Team statistics
All statistics are for regular season only.

See also
HC Slovan Bratislava all-time KHL record
List of HC Slovan Bratislava seasons

References

Bratislava
HC Slovan Bratislava seasons
Bratislava